The Coolangatta Gold is a 1984 Australian film which led to the establishment of the iron man race The Coolangatta Gold.

Plot
Joe Lucas is determined that his son Adam will become a champion iron man. He neglects his younger son, Steve, who is an aspiring band manager and enjoys karate, as well as being his brother's training partner.

The leading iron man event is The Coolangatta Gold, an arduous competition for $20,000 prize money. The favorite for this event is champion iron man Grant Kenny. Kenny's father beat Joe Lucas for the iron man title in 1960.

Steve falls in love with a ballet dancer, Kerri, who inspires him to compete with his brother in The Coolangatta Gold.

Cast
Joss McWilliam as Steve Lucas
Nick Tate as Joe Lucas
Colin Friels as Adam Lucas
Josephine Smulders as Kerri Dean
Robyn Nevin as Roslyn Lucas
Grant Kenny as himself
Melanie Day as Gilda
Melissa Jaffer as Ballet Teacher
Wilbur Wilde as Lead Singer
Kate Mailman as Child on beach

Production
Writer Peter Schreck and director Igor Auzins had worked together successfully on the 1982 film We of the Never Never and decided to collaborate on another project. They wanted to do a contemporary love story in the sporting genre, and originally thought of doing a $1.5 million film shot in Bondi. However, after a few days it became obvious they wanted to do something more ambitious. Auzins and Schreck formed a company, Angoloro Productions, with John Weiley as a third partner in December 1982. They then approached Hoyts Edgley, which agreed within 24 hours to finance the film.

Soundtrack

Reception
The film performed disappointingly at the box office. Jonathan Chissick, managing director of Hoyts, said "I thought it was the best script to come out of Australia. So, we failed there somewhere. I don't want to point my finger but there was obviously a failure."

The Coolangatta Gold was parodied by the Australian comedy troupe The D-Generation in the 1993 season of The Late Show. The sketch "The Last Aussie Auteur: A Tribute to Filmmaker Warren Perso" features excerpts from various (fictional) Australian films, one being a box-office flop titled The Bermagui Bronze.

Home media
The Coolangatta Gold was released on DVD by Umbrella Entertainment in November 2012. The DVD is compatible with all region codes and includes special features such as a photo gallery, the making of The Coolangatta Gold and a Good Morning Australia segment. The music recording of The Coolangatta Gold: Original Soundtrack Recording was produced by Ashley Irwin and edited for the soundtrack album by Philip Powers.

References

External links

The Coolangatta Gold at TCMDB
The Coolangatta Gold at Oz Movies

1984 films
Films scored by Bill Conti
Australian sports drama films
Films set in Queensland
Films shot in Queensland
Films directed by Igor Auzins
1980s English-language films